Emerald Princess is a Crown-class cruise ship for Princess Cruises that entered service in April 2007.

Emerald Princess launched from the Italian shipyard of Fincantieri Monfalcone on 1 June 2006. She was then handed over to Princess Cruises on 24 March 2007. Emerald Princess was christened on 13 May 2007, in Greece.

Service history
Emerald Princess began commercial service on 11 April 2007, offering 12-day Mediterranean and Greek Isles cruises, and continued sailing Europe for Summer 2007. She was then re-positioned in Fort Lauderdale in Fall to offer Caribbean cruises.

Refurbishment schedule
The vessel entered dry-dock on 30 November 2015, for 13 days of minor refurbishments. The ship left dry-dock on 13 December. Previously Emerald Princess underwent dry-dock renovations from 7 December through 17 December 2012.

Areas of operation
Emerald Princess is usually based in Europe in the summer and in the United States in the winter.  Past itineraries have included 11-day cruises to Scandinavia & Russia from Copenhagen and Warnemuende near Rostock, 10-day cruises to Canada/New England from New York, and 10-day cruises to the Caribbean from Fort Lauderdale.  In 2014 she was based in Southampton for cruises to the Baltic, Mediterranean, and the fjords of Norway, as well as to the Canary Islands.  She then re-positioned to Houston for seven-day cruises to the western Caribbean in the winter 2014-2015 season.

Coronavirus quarantine 

Reports in May 2020 indicated that there had been no confirmed COVID-19 cases on this vessel which was docked in Florida as of 9 May 2020. Some days earlier, it had been denied permission to dock at Nassau, but by that time, contained only crew members. Passengers had been allowed to disembark previously. On 9 May, the 123 Canadian and American crew members were allowed to disembark at Port Everglades, although others remained on board.

Incidents

On 17 May 2011, the ship sustained considerable damage to several lifeboats when a fuel loading barge collided with the side of the ship while in the port of St. Petersburg, Russia. After inspection by authorities, it was determined the ship still had enough passenger space in an emergency using inflatable life rafts, and the ship continued on her planned itinerary.

On 25 July 2017 Kristy Manzanares, 43, was murdered by her husband Kenneth in their cabin during a cruise. He later admitted second-degree murder following an FBI investigation, receiving a 30-year sentence in 2021.
He later died in prison that same year.

References

External links

 Princess Cruises: Emerald Princess

2006 ships
Ships built by Fincantieri
Ships built in Monfalcone
Ships of Princess Cruises